Field Broughton is a village in the South Lakeland district of the English county of Cumbria.

The village forms part of the civil parish of Broughton East.

Location 
It is about four miles away from the town of Grange-over-Sands.

Transport 
For transport there is the A590 road and Grange-over-Sands railway station nearby.

Nearby settlements 
Nearby settlements include the town of Grange-over-Sands, the villages of High Newton and Cartmel and the hamlets of Low Newton and Barber Green. It has a church called St. Peter's Church.

See also

Listed buildings in Broughton East

References 

 http://www.francisfrith.com/field-broughton/
 https://web.archive.org/web/20100925175727/http://www.visitcumbria.com/churches/fieldbroughton.htm

Villages in Cumbria
South Lakeland District